The Beverly Theater is a former art-house theater in the Olive corridor commerce area of University City, MO.

History 

In the 1960s, Mid America Theaters owned the building, and showed art-house films. In 1964, it was renamed the Fine Arts.

The theater is currently occupied by a Chinese restaurant.

References

Theatres on the National Register of Historic Places in Missouri
National Register of Historic Places in St. Louis County, Missouri